The Sawblade EP (also called the Buzzsaw EP) is a handmade CD-R made by Isis for their tour with Neurosis and Candiria, limited to 200 copies (the first 40 with red blade inserts, the remaining 160 with black). It was sold at these shows at a limit of 15 per night, and the leftover copies were given to friends of the band as a year-end "thank you" gift. The vinyl run of this release was limited to 250 copies. As such, Aaron Turner doesn't consider this an 'official' Isis release, describing it as “more like a special artifact for us and the few converts we had at the time”.

"Emission of the Signal" and "House of Low Culture" were both constructed by Aaron Turner and Jeff Caxide at home. "Streetcleaner" and "Hand of Doom" are both covers of Godflesh and Black Sabbath, respectively. The former was recorded for Isis' 2000 split release with Pig Destroyer; both were recorded during the Red Sea sessions in 1999. The CD version of the release was a genuine sawblade with a CD physically attached to it, which several venues prohibited from sale. To the best of Turner's knowledge, “no one was ever injured by one of these”.

The Japanese double release of Mosquito Control/the Red Sea features both cover songs as bonuses; "Streetcleaner" appears at the end of disc 1 (Mosquito Control), and "Hand of Doom" appears at the end of disc 2 (the Red Sea/1998 Demo); both tracks were later selected for inclusion on posthumous b-side album Temporal.

Track listing
Tracks 1 and 4 written by Aaron Turner and Jeff Caxide.

 "Emission of the Signal" – 4:53
 "Streetcleaner" – 5:42 (Broadrick)
 "Hand of Doom" – 8:36 (Iommi/Osbourne/Ward/Butler)
 "House of Low Culture" – 11:09

Personnel 
Band members

 Jeff Caxide – bass
 Aaron Harris – drums
 Michael Gallagher – guitar
 Aaron Turner – vocals, guitar, design
 Jay Randall – electronics, vocals
 Bryant Clifford Meyer

Other personnel

 Kurt Ballou – audio recording and production
 Greg Moss – live sound

Notes

References

1999 albums
Isis (band) albums
Hydra Head Records albums
Albums with cover art by Aaron Turner
Albums produced by Kurt Ballou